Luis Phelipe de Souza Figueiredo (born 20 February 2001), known as Luis Phelipe, is a Brazilian professional footballer who plays as a left winger for Botafogo on loan from Atlético Goianiense.

Club career

Red Bull Brasil
Born in Santos, São Paulo, Luis Phelipe represented Santos and Portuguesa Santista as a youth before joining Red Bull Brasil in 2016. He made his senior debut for the latter club on 22 September 2018, coming on as a second-half substitute and scoring his team's second in a 3–1 home win over Desportivo Brasil, for the year's Copa Paulista.

Red Bull Bragantino
Luis Phelipe became a Red Bull Bragantino player when Red Bull Brasil merged with Clube Atlético Bragantino in April 2019. He made his national league debut on 18 May, replacing Barreto late into a 0–1 away loss against Londrina for the Série B championship.

Luis Phelipe featured in just one further match for Braga in the campaign, as his side achieved promotion as champions, but left before the season ended.

Red Bull Salzburg
On 18 July 2019, Luis Phelipe was announced as a new signing by Red Bull Salzburg, with a contract that runs until 2024. He was immediately assigned to farm team FC Liefering in the 2. Liga.

Luis Phelipe was mainly used as a substitute for Liefering, scoring four goals as the club finished third.

Return to Red Bull Bragantino (loan)
In August 2020, Luis Phelipe returned to former side Bragantino, on loan for one year. He made his Série A debut on 19 August, replacing Morato and scoring the winner in a 2–1 home success over Fluminense.

Luis Phelipe did not establish himself at Bragantino on his return, and featured sparingly.

Lugano (loan)
On 28 July 2021, Luis Phelipe moved to Swiss Super League club Lugano on a one-year loan deal, joining a host of compatriots and fellow countryman manager Abel Braga. He featured in three of the five matches when Braga was in charge, but was very rarely used after Braga was sacked and Mattia Croci-Torti became the new manager. On 11 February 2022, Lugano announced the early termination of Luis Phelipe's loan. On the next day, Red Bull Salzburg announced that his contract with Red Bull is also terminated.

Atlético Goianiense
Luis Phelipe subsequently joined Atlético Goianiense.

Náutico (loan)
On 14 April 2022, Luis Phelipe was loaned to Náutico.

Career statistics

Honours
Red Bull Bragantino
Campeonato Brasileiro Série B: 2019

References

External links
 
 

2001 births
Living people
Sportspeople from Santos, São Paulo
Brazilian footballers
Association football wingers
Red Bull Brasil players
Red Bull Bragantino players
FC Red Bull Salzburg players
FC Liefering players
FC Lugano players
Atlético Clube Goianiense players
Clube Náutico Capibaribe players
Campeonato Brasileiro Série A players
Campeonato Brasileiro Série B players
2. Liga (Austria) players
Swiss Super League players
Brazilian expatriate footballers
Brazilian expatriate sportspeople in Austria
Brazilian expatriate sportspeople in Switzerland
Expatriate footballers in Austria
Expatriate footballers in Switzerland